SpaceX CRS-18, also known as SpX-18, was SpaceX's 18th flight to the International Space Station under the Commercial Resupply Services program for NASA. It was launched on 25 July 2019 aboard a Falcon 9 rocket.

The same Dragon capsule has previously flown to the ISS in April 2015 and December 2017. This was the first time a capsule was used for a third flight.

Primary payload
In February 2016, it was announced that NASA had awarded a contract extension to SpaceX for five CRS additional missions (CRS-16 to CRS-20).

NASA has contracted for the CRS-18 mission from SpaceX and therefore determines the primary payload, date/time of launch, and orbital parameters for the Dragon space capsule. It carried the third International Docking Adapter (IDA-3).

The following is a breakdown of cargo bound for the ISS:
 Science investigations: 
 Crew supplies: 
 Vehicle hardware: 
 Spacewalk equipment: 
 Computer resources: 
 External payloads: IDA-3 

The Dragon spacecraft also featured a handful of ceramic heat shield tiles, meant to flight-test a critical component of the SpaceX Starship spacecraft.

See also
Uncrewed spaceflights to the International Space Station

References

External links
 NASA
 SpaceX official page for the Dragon spacecraft

SpaceX Dragon
Spacecraft launched in 2019
SpaceX payloads contracted by NASA
Supply vehicles for the International Space Station
Spacecraft which reentered in 2019